Courtemanche is a French commune.

Courtemanche may also refer to:

Courtemanche (surname)
63129 Courtemanche, main-belt asteroid
 Augustin le Gardeur de Courtemanche